James Hazen (born September 15, 1981) is an American professional golfer from Long Island, New York.

Professional wins

 2006 New York State Open
 2010 Massachusetts Open, Providence Open
 2014 Long Island Open
 2015 Manchester Open
 2016 Long Island Open (2)

References

American male golfers
1981 births
Living people